Yampi Lass was a stores lighter of the Royal Australian Navy (RAN) during the Second World War.

Built as a scow, S.B.C was used by the Swan Brewery Company and transported beer down the Swan River. She was bought by the Yampi Sound Mining Company and used to transport stores to their mine on Koolan Island.

She was requisitioned by the Royal Australian Navy during the Second World War, however she was never commissioned. Salvaged in October 1945, she was sold for £15 10s.

During the war, she was used to resupply the Australian commando forces operating in Timor, with supplies including ammunition, currency, and miscellaneous items. She was disguised as a native trader and her crew were selected on the basis of their similarity to the native population.

Notes

References
Wilson, Michael; Royal Australian Navy 21st Century Warships, Naval auxiliaries 1911 to 1999 including Defence Maritime Services, Profile No. 4 - Revised Edition, Topmill Pty Ltd, Marrickville. 

Cargo ships of the Royal Australian Navy
World War II shipwrecks in the Pacific Ocean